Andy Dunbobbin (born January 1975) is a Labour Party politician who has been the North Wales Police and Crime Commissioner since the 2021 England and Wales police and crime commissioner elections.

Early career and election

Before being elected as North Wales Police and Crime Commissioner, Dunbobbin was a County Councillor representing Connah's Quay Golftyn ward on Flintshire County Council, having first been elected in 2013.

In March 2020, Dunbobbin was selected for the Welsh Labour Party to stand in the 2021 England and Wales police and crime commissioner elections for the North Wales region.

Dunbobbin was elected as the North Wales Police and Crime Commissioner, beating the Conservative candidate by 7,885 votes following the allocation of second preferences.

Personal life

Dunbobbin is married with two children.

References

External links

Welsh Labour politicians
Living people
Police and crime commissioners in Wales
1975 births